Mont Ngaoui is the highest mountain in the Central African Republic.

External links
 Peakbagger listing

Ngaoui
Ngaoui
Ngaoui
Cameroon–Central African Republic border
Nana-Mambéré
Ngaoui